Tettenhall railway station was a station on the Wombourne Branch Line, serving the town of Tettenhall in the West Midlands of England. It was opened by the Great Western Railway in 1925 and closed in 1932. A significant number of station amenities were supplied but failed to improve patronage at the station, which ultimately led to its closure.

The station site is a rarity in that, despite the removal of the line 33 years after the station closed, it is almost totally complete.

Since 2014, the building has been home to a tea room named 'Cupcake Lane' having previously been a park ranger station. The goods depot behind the station is now a small transport museum.

The station is also the start and the northern end of the South Staffordshire Railway Walk which carries on down towards Wombourne railway station and onto Gornal Halt railway station.

References

Further reading

Disused railway stations in Wolverhampton
Former Great Western Railway stations
Railway stations in Great Britain opened in 1925
Railway stations in Great Britain closed in 1932